Léa Mysius (born 4 April 1989) is a French film director and screenwriter. In 2017, she made her feature directorial debut with the film Ava, which premiered at the 2017 Cannes Film Festival where it won the SACD Award. Her second feature film, The Five Devils, was screened in the Directors' Fortnight section at the 2022 Cannes Film Festival. As a screenwriter, Mysius has also collaborated with Arnaud Desplechin on Ismael's Ghosts (2017) and Oh Mercy! (2019), Jacques Audiard on Paris, 13th District (2021) and Claire Denis on Stars at Noon (2022).

Early life and education 
Mysius grew up in the Médoc region of France but moved to Réunion at the age of 13. Her twin sister is set designer Esther Mysius, with whom she often collaborates on film projects. Her brother, Nathan Mysius, also works in the film industry.

At age 17, Mysius obtained a baccalauréat scientifique. She studied literature at the Sorbonne in Paris. In 2010, she entered La Fémis, studying in the screenwriting department. She graduated from La Fémis in 2014.

Career 
She made her directorial debut in 2013 with the short film Cadavre exquis, for which she also wrote the screenplay. The film won the Prix SACD de la meilleure première oeuvre de fiction at the 2013 Clermont-Ferrand International Short Film Festival. Her 2014 short film Thunderbirds, which Mysius directed and for which she wrote the screenplay, was also a success at festivals. It was nominated for the Grand Jury Prize in the European Student Films category at the 2015 Angers European First Film Festival and was nominated for the Cinéfondation Selection at the 2014 Cannes Film Festival. L'île jaune, co-directed with Paul Guilhaume in 2016, won the Grand Jury Prize in the French First Short Films category at the 2016 Angers European First Film Festival.

In 2017, Mysius co-wrote the screenplay for Arnaud Desplechin's Ismael's Ghosts, which premiered at the opening of the 2017 Cannes Film Festival. Mysius was also represented at Cannes 2017 with her feature film directorial debut, Ava. The films follows a 13-year-old girl named Ava (Noée Abita) who spends a summer by the sea shortly before she goes completely blind due to retinitis pigmentosa. Mysius wrote the film's screenplay, which was also her graduation project at La Fémis. Paul Guilhaume, with whom she had worked on L'île jaune, was the film's cinematographer. At Cannes, Ava was nominated for the Caméra d'Or and won the Prix SACD for Best Feature. The film also received nominations for the Bronze Horse at the 2017 Stockholm International Film Festival and the Sutherland Award in the First Feature Competition at the 2017 BFI London Film Festival.

In 2019, Mysius once again collaborated with Desplechin, co-writing the screenplay for his film Oh Mercy!. In 2020, Mysius and Desplechin received a César Award nomination in the category Best Adaptation for their screenplay, which they adapted from Mosco Boucault's France 3 television documentary film Roubaix, commissariat central (2008).

Her second feature film as director, The Five Devils (Les cinq diables), was selected to be screened in the Directors' Fortnight section at the 2022 Cannes Film Festival. Myisus also co-wrote the script for Claire Denis' 2022 film Stars at Noon with Denis and Andrew Litvack, adapted from the novel The Stars at Noon by American author Denis Johnson. Stars at Noon also had its world premiere at the 2022 Cannes Film Festival, where it was selected to compete for the Palme d'Or.

Personal life 
Mysius is in a relationship with cinematographer Paul Guilhaume.

Filmography

Awards and nominations

References

External links 
 
 

1989 births
Living people
21st-century French screenwriters
French women film directors
French women screenwriters
People from Bordeaux